The Para is a river in Ryazan Oblast in Russia, a right tributary of the Oka. The Para freezes up in November and stays icebound until April.

References 

Rivers of Ryazan Oblast